Dalwhinnie railway station is a railway station serving the village of Dalwhinnie, Highland, Scotland. There is a crossover at the south end of the station to allow trains to turn back if the line north to Newtonmore is closed.

History 
The station opened in 1863. The station buildings were completed in 1864 by Joseph Mitchell & Company.

Accidents and incidents 
In early March 1881 during a severe snow storm a passenger train was stranded for 20 hours two miles from Dalwhinnie. Employees of the railway company were dispatched to the Dalwhinnie Hotel to procure food and refreshments for the passengers, but the gale and drift were so severe that the effort failed. In the darkness the employees failed to reach the hotel. Eventually the employees escorted the 15 passengers in daylight two miles to the hotel but it took them two hours. Some passengers chose to remain on the train but as there was no relief in the weather, and the train being completely covered by snow by the next day, they too were escorted to the hotel.

On 4 July 1927 the body of the station master, William Maclaren was found in the burned out station buildings. He had sustained a bullet wound to the head.

In 1938, John Ross joined a train from Dalwhinnie. He leaned out of the window and waved to friends on the platform. He failed to observe a water tank at the side of the line and the protruding hose hanging from the tank struck him and he was pulled out of the carriage window and fell onto the line. He suffered a fractured leg and other injuries and was treated at the Royal Northern Infirmary.

On 10 April 2021, an HST derailed near Dalwhinnie.

Facilities 
Dalwhinnie has very basic facilities, being a small car park and bike racks adjacent to platform 1, benches on both platforms and a waiting shelter (within which there is also a payphone) on platform 1. There is step-free access to platform 1 only: platform 2 can only be accessed from the footbridge. As there are no facilities to purchase tickets, passengers must buy one in advance, or from the guard on the train.

Platform layout 
Platform 1 on the southbound line can accommodate trains having five coaches, whereas platform 2 on the northbound line can hold nine. The passing loop continues south towards  as double-track line.

Passenger volume 

The statistics cover twelve month periods that start in April.

Services
The Caledonian Sleeper between Inverness and London Euston also calls here (set down only northbound, pickup only southbound). On Sundays, there are only three trains northbound to Inverness (one of which extends to Elgin), and three south to Edinburgh, including the Caledonian Sleeper.

References

Bibliography

External Links 

 Video footage of the station on YouTube

Railway stations in Highland (council area)
Former Highland Railway stations
Railway stations in Great Britain opened in 1863
Railway stations served by ScotRail
Railway stations served by Caledonian Sleeper
Joseph Mitchell railway stations